The 2007–08 Frauen-Bundesliga was the 18th season of the Frauen-Bundesliga, Germany's premier football league. It began on 19 August 2007 and ended on 15 June 2008.

Final standings

Results

Top scorers

References

2007-08
Ger
1
Women1